The Oxford Socratic Club was a student club that met from 1942 to 1954 dedicated to providing an open forum for the discussion of the intellectual difficulties connected with religion and with Christianity in particular.

The club was formed in December 1941, at Oxford University, by Stella Aldwinckle of the Oxford Pastorate and a group of undergraduate students. A student by the name of Monica Shorten had expressed a need for such a club. The society was to follow the practice of Socrates to "follow the argument wherever it led them." As all inter-college clubs at Oxford had to have a "senior member of the university" as a sponsor, Aldwinckle implored C. S. Lewis to be its first president.  Lewis enthusiastically served as president from 1942 until he left for Cambridge in 1954.  Basil Mitchell succeeded Lewis as president in February 1955. The first meeting was held on 26 January 1942, and the club disbanded in 1972.

The Oxford Socratic Club met on Monday evenings during term from 8.15 pm to 10.30 pm, with many undergraduates lingering long afterward.  Many of the most notable figures of Oxford University presented or responded to papers, including G.E.M. Anscombe, Antony Flew, Iris Murdoch, Austin Farrer, A.J. Ayer, D.M. MacKinnon, C.E.M. Joad, E.L. Mascall, Gabriel Marcel, Frederick Copleston, I.M. Crombie, Basil Mitchell, R.M. Hare, Michael Polanyi, Gilbert Ryle, J.L. Austin, Dorothy Sayers.

Commenting on the Socratic Club at Oxford, C.S. Lewis stated, "In any fairly large and talkative community such as a university, there is always the danger that those who think alike should gravitate together into 'coteries' where they will henceforth encounter opposition only in the emasculated form of rumor that the outsiders say thus and thus.  The absent are easily refuted, complacent dogmatism thrives, and differences of opinion are embittered by group hostility.  Each group hears not the best, but the worst, that the other groups can say.”

Famous debates
24 January 1944, C.E.M. Joad and C.S. Lewis, "On Being Reviewed by Christians."

This debate involved a presentation by Joad that was based on his recent book, published in November 1942, God and Evil, which contained his arguments for theism, but also against Christianity. Joad was at this time taking a closer look at Christianity because of the evil he saw in Nazi Germany. He cited Lewis many times in his book, which was undoubtedly one of the reasons he was invited to address the Socratic Club. Joad later became a Christian.

2 February 1948, Elizabeth Anscombe and C. S. Lewis, "The Self-Refuting Nature of Naturalism"

Catholic philosopher G.E.M. Anscombe debated Lewis about a portion of Lewis's 1947 book, Miracles, known today as the Argument from Reason, in which he stated that since naturalists claimed all of nature to be irrational, that would make the claim of the naturalists also irrational and therefore contrary to reason (for example, that if there is no God, if nature is the product of chance, then how can a human brain offer anything but chance observations that have no authority?). She claimed that he had mistakenly equated non-rational causes with irrational causes and confused the concepts of cause, reason, and explanation. John R. Lucas later helped in a rerun of this debate, which ended up vindicating Lewis. Victor Reppert's book, C.S. Lewis's Dangerous Idea, further supports Lewis's original argument.

Meetings of the Socratic Club
1942
Can Science Render Religion Unnecessary? H. A. Hodges
1943
Science and Faith, Frank Sherwood Taylor; 
Is the New Testament Reliable Evidence? Richard Kehoe
1944
On Being Reviewed by Christians, C. E. M. Joad; 
Materialism and Agnosticism, J. K. White, Gordon Preston; 
The Grounds of Modern Agnosticism, H. H. Price; 
Has Psychology Debunked Sin? L. W. Grensted, Barbara Falk
1945
Marxist and Christian Views of the Nature of Man, Archibald Robertson, Emile Cammaerts
1946
Can Science Provide a Basis for Ethics? C. H. Waddington, Austin Farrer; 
The Limits of Positivism, Friedrich Waismann
1947
Did the Resurrection Happen? R. E. Davies, T. M. Parker
1948
The Self-Refuting Nature of Naturalism, Elizabeth Anscombe, C. S. Lewis;
Rudolf Steiner and the Scientific Outlook, Alfred Heidenreich, Frank Sherwood Taylor; 
Atheism, J. B. S. Haldane, Ian M. Crombie

Trinity Term, 1949
25 April	Can Science Create Values? J. Bronowski, Basil Mitchell
2 May		Some Remarks on Analysis, Personality, and Religion, G. J. C. Midgley
9 May		Christianity, the Church, and the Churches, Oliver Tomkins, T. M. Parker
16 May	        Psychoanalysis and Religion, Anita Kohsen, R. S. Lee
30 May	        Value Judgments, R. M. Hare
6 June		The Morality of Dangerous Devices, I. M. Crombie, N. J. P. Brown

Michaelmas Term, 1949
10 Oct		Are Tautologies Really Necessary? P. J. Fitzgerald, C. S. Lewis
17 Oct		Agreement and Disagreement in Ethics, A. C. Ewing, R. M. Hare
24 Oct		Philosophy and Psychoanalysis,	John Wisdom, Leycester King
31 Oct		Some Displaced Questions, E. L. Mascall, A. G. N. Flew
7 Nov		Hindu Speculation and Jung, Basil de Mel, Vernon Katz
21 Nov	        Can Science Be Creative? C. H. Waddington, Frank Sherwood-Taylor
28 Nov	        Physics and philosophy, Lord Cherwell, J. C. Stuart

Hilary Term, 1950
23 Jan		The Nature of Faith, J. P. Hickinbotham, E. L. Mascall
6 Feb		Certainty, L. A. Grint, C. D. Rollins
13 Feb	        Grounds for Disbelief in God, Archibald Robertson, C. S. Lewis
20 Feb	        Freudian Psychology and Christian Faith, B. A. Farrell, R. S. Lee
27 Feb	        The Relation of Psychical Research to the Scientific Method, N. M. Tyrell, L. W. Grensted
6 Mar		Marxism, Douglas Hyde, V. A. Demant

Trinity Term, 1950
1 May		Can We Trust the Gospels? D. E. Nineham, G. E. F. Chilver
8 May		Biology and Theism, A. Rendle Short, A. C. Hardy
15 May	        Theology and Verification, A. G. N. Flew, Bernard Williams
22 May	        The Spirit of Religious Intolerance, Gervase Mathew, H. C. Carpenter
29 May	        Criteria in Ethical Judgment, G. E. Hughes, S. E. Tomlin
5 June		Personalism, J. B. Coates

Michaelmas Term, 1950
16 Oct		God and History, Michael Foster, C. S. Lewis
30 Oct		Explanation: Scientific and Philosophical, David Mitchell, S. F. Mason
7 Nov		Is Theology a Science? G. C. Stead, Austin Farrer
13 Nov	        Reason and Rationalism in Religion, R. S. Lee, A. P. d’Entreves

Hilary Term, 1951
22 Jan		The Problem of Freedom, J. Ward-Smith
29 Jan		On Clearing Up Philosophical Muddles, Bernard Williams
12 Feb	        Psychopathology and Sin, Seymore Spencer, Victor White
30 Apr	        The Philosophical Basis of Marxism, Marcus Wheeler, S. F. Mason

Michaelmas Term, 1951
22 Oct		Appreciation of Linguistic Analysis, I. T. Ramsey
5 Nov		Do the Mystics Know? Thomas Corbishley

Hilary Term, 1952
28 Jan		Imago Dei and the Unconscious, Oswald Summer, R. W. Kosterlitz
4 Feb		The Buddhist Approach to Philosophy, Auguste Purfurst, Basil Mitchell
25 Feb	        The Gospels—History or Myth? Christopher Evans, P. H. Nowell-Smith
3 Mar		Rational Existentialism, E. L. Mascall, Iris Murdoch
10 Mar	        Cosmology and Theism, G. J. Whitrow, E. L. Mascall

Trinity Term, 1952
28 Apr	        The Notion of Development in Psychology and Its Bearing Upon Religion, R. S. Lee
5 May		Creation Never Was, Michael Scriven
12 May	        Christianity and Humanism in Western Culture, Christopher Dawson, I.T. Ramsey
19 May	        What Is Theology? H. D. Lewis, J. J. Hartland-Swann
26 May	        Subjective and Objective Language, J. Z. Young, Gilbert Ryle
2 June		The Stability of Beliefs, Michael Polanyi, C. T. W. Curle
9 June		Guilt and Freedom, John Wisdom, J. L. Austin

Michaelmas Term, 1952
17 Oct		Contemporary Philosophy and Christian Faith, Basil Mitchell
24 Oct		The Logic of Personality, Bernard Mayo, R. M. Hare
3 Nov		A Living Universe, D. E. Harding, C. S. Lewis
10 Nov	        A New Humanist Alternative to Christ and Mary, H. J. Blackham, Iris Murdoch
17 Nov	        The Ethic of Belief, Brand Blanshard, H. H. Price
24 Nov         Topic Unknown, J. N. Findlay
1 Dec		Soloviev and His Idea of Good and Evil, Nicholas Zernov, E. W. Lambert

1953
The Gospels: Myth or History? R. Creham, A. R. C. Leaney

1954
The Anatomy of Atheism, E. W. Lambert, John Lucas

Other Socratic Clubs
Though the Oxford Socratic Club disbanded, several Socratic Clubs now exist in colleges and universities.  Among these are Socratic Clubs in Utrecht, the Netherlands, Vanderbilt University, Oregon State University, the University of Gonzaga, Trinity Bible College, Samford University (founded in 2007) and the Queen's University of Belfast, in Northern Ireland.

As of 2007 there has been an Oxford University Socrates Society with similar aims to those of the Socratic Club.

The Queen's University of Belfast Socratic Club, founded in 2013, holds similar aims to that of the original at Oxford.

There are also branches of the society at West Buckland School in Devon and King Edward's School at Bath, where these branches are referred to as "The Socrates Club" and have the same aims as the original Oxford University "Socratic Society" of C.S. Lewis.

See also
 Socrates – the Ancient Greek philosopher after whom the club was named.
 Socrates Cafe – an international network of gatherings of diverse people to engage in discussions via the Socratic method
 The Fourth K – a novel by Mario Puzo

Notes

References
 Hooper, Walter. "Oxford's Bonny Fighter." Chapter 16 in C. S. Lewis at the Breakfast Table. James T. Como, ed. Pages 137–185. New York: Harcourt Brace & Company, 1992.

Further reading
Aldwinckle, Stella (2015). "Memories of the Socratic Club", in C. S. Lewis and His Circle: Essays and Memoirs from the Oxford C. S. Lewis Society, edited by Roger White, Judith Wolfe & Brendan N. Wolfe, Oxford University Press, pp. 192–194, .

 Socratic Digest. Reprinted from five issues originally published separately between the years 1943 and 1952. Edited by Joel D. Heck. Concordia University Press, Austin, Texas 2012.

External links
 The Socratic Club: Religious Debate at Oxford University
 The Samford University Socratic Club
 The Anscombe Affair, studied from the primary sources
 Is Theology Poetry? presented by CS Lewis before the Socratic Club in 1944. (PDF, Canadian public domain edition)

Clubs and societies of the University of Oxford
Debating societies
History of Oxford
Culture in Oxford
Samford University
Student organizations established in 1941
Organizations disestablished in 1972